Monochamus murinus is a species of beetle in the family Cerambycidae. It was described by Charles Joseph Gahan in 1888. It is known from Senegal and the Ivory Coast.

References

murinus
Beetles described in 1888